Polyrhythm Addicts is a hip hop group composed of DJ Spinna, Mr Complex, Shabaam Sahdeeq, and Tiye Phoenix. The lineup on its first album included Apani B, but she was replaced by Phoenix when the group reunited in 2007.

Polyrhythm Addicts began as a collaborative project set up by Nervous Records in 1999 that united several New York City rappers for one single, "Not Your Ordinary." The reception paved the way for the album Rhyme Related, released in 1999. The group then disbanded to focus on their individual careers, reuniting for the Breaking Glass album, released in 2007.

The group's debut is an Allmusic album pick, the review stating, "The tracks included are saturated with quality from top to bottom."  Its second album was released on Babygrande Records. Both of its albums feature a guest appearance from Pharoahe Monch.

Discography
Rhyme-Related (1999)
Break Glass (2007)

References

American hip hop groups